Politz Hebrew Academy, formerly known as William C. Jacobs School and Fayette School, is a historic school  located in the Bustleton neighborhood of Philadelphia, Pennsylvania. The building consists of an original section designed by Samuel Sloan in 1855, and the main building built in 1915.  The original building is a two-story, stone building sheathed in stucco. The 1915 building is a -story, three-bay, rectangular brick building in the Colonial Revival style. It features a hipped roof and gable dormers.

The building was added to the National Register of Historic Places in 1988.

References

External links

School buildings on the National Register of Historic Places in Philadelphia
Colonial Revival architecture in Pennsylvania
School buildings completed in 1915
Northeast Philadelphia
Religious schools in Pennsylvania
Jewish schools in the United States
1915 establishments in Pennsylvania